The Lutheran School of Theology at Chicago (LSTC) is a seminary of the Evangelical Lutheran Church in America in Chicago, Illinois. LSTC is a member of the Association of Chicago Theological Schools (ACTS), a consortium of eleven area seminaries and theological schools. It shares the JKM Library and portions of its campus with McCormick Theological Seminary. LSTC is accredited by the Association of Theological Schools and regionally accredited by the Higher Learning Commission.

On May 5, 2022, LSTC and McCormick announced the pending sale of their  campus bounded by 55th Street, Greenwood Avenue, University Avenue, and 54th Place to the University of Chicago, whose Hyde Park campus is across 55th Street from the seminaries. Under the proposal, the two seminaries will lease back part of the facilities for a limited period of time.

See also
 Gruber Collection
 Zygon (journal)

References

External links

 
Seminaries and theological colleges in Illinois
Universities and colleges in Chicago
Educational institutions established in 1962
Lutheranism in Illinois
Lutheran seminaries
Hyde Park, Chicago
1962 establishments in Illinois